Jeremy Paul Swift (born 27 June 1960) is an English actor. He studied drama at Guildford School of Acting from 1978 to 1981 and worked almost exclusively in theatre throughout the 1980s, working with companies such as Deborah Warner's Kick Theatre company and comedy performance-art group The People Show. During this period he also appeared in numerous television commercials. In the 1990s, he acted at the National Theatre alongside David Tennant and Richard Wilson in Phyllida Lloyd's production of What the Butler Saw. 

Swift acted in films such as Robert Altman's murder mystery Gosford Park (2001), Michael Apted's historical drama Amazing Grace (2006), and the family adventure film Mary Poppins Returns (2018). He also appeared in Vanity Fair (1998), Foyle's War (2013-2015), Downton Abbey (2013-2015), The Durrells (2016), and National Treasure (2016). In 2021, he was nominated for a Primetime Emmy Award for Outstanding Supporting Actor in a Comedy Series for his performance in Ted Lasso.

Life and career
Swift was born in Stockton-on-Tees, County Durham. In the 2000s, Swift appeared in Gosford Park playing the footman Arthur, and Roman Polanski's Oliver Twist as Mr. Bumble. For BBC3, he played Barry in the cult hit The Smoking Room and had a theatrical hit with Abigail's Party, the last production at the old Hampstead Theatre and their longest running West End transfer.

In 2009, he played the lead in the true story of art forger Shaun Greenhalgh in The Antiques' Rogue Show for BBC2 with Liz Smith and Peter Vaughn, The Deacon in a film adaptation of Anton Chekhov's short story The Duel and featured in Canoe Man, a 2010 TV drama based on the John Darwin disappearance case.

He starred in the independent British feature film Downhill, which is a comedy about four men attempting Alfred Wainwright's Coast to Coast Walk which was released in 2014 and co-stars Ned Dennehy, Karl Theobald and Richard Lumsden. The film was directed by James Rouse and the screenplay was written by Torben Betts.

Swift is also a composer and his work includes the score for Werewolves: The Dark Survivors (Wide-eyed Entertainment) for the Discovery channel and ITV global.

On ITV, Swift played Septimus Spratt, the butler of the Dowager Countess, in Downton Abbey for three seasons and has  been seen as Dennis, manservant to Countess Mavrodaki (Leslie Caron) in Episodes 3-6 of The Durrells. He also played election agent Glenvil Harris in the last two series of Foyle's War. He played Gooding in Mary Poppins Returns, which was released in 2018.

In 2020, he played the role of Leslie Higgins in Apple TV+'s show, Ted Lasso, for which he received a Primetime Emmy Award nomination for Outstanding Supporting Actor in a Comedy Series in 2021.

Personal life
Swift is married to actress Mary Roscoe (who plays his wife, Julie Higgins, on Ted Lasso), whom he met while working on a play. They have two adopted children.

Filmography

Film

Television

Awards and nominations

References

External links
 

1960 births
Living people
English male stage actors
English male television actors
English male voice actors
Actors from County Durham
Actors from Stockton-on-Tees
20th-century English male actors
21st-century English male actors
English male film actors
Alumni of the Guildford School of Acting